Greater Poland Voivodeship, also known as Wielkopolska Voivodeship, Wielkopolska Province, or Greater Poland Province, is a voivodeship, or province, in west-central Poland. It was created on 1 January 1999 out of the former Poznań, Kalisz, Konin, Piła and Leszno Voivodeships, pursuant to the Polish local government reforms adopted in 1998. The province is named after the region called Greater Poland or Wielkopolska . The modern province includes most of this historic region, except for some western parts.

Its capital city is Poznań; other important cities include Kalisz, Konin, Piła, Ostrów Wielkopolski, Gniezno (an early capital of Poland) and Leszno. It is bordered by seven other voivodeships: West Pomeranian to the northwest, Pomeranian to the north, Kuyavian-Pomeranian to the north-east, Łódź to the south-east, Opole to the south, Lower Silesian to the southwest and Lubusz to the west.

The city of Poznań has international twinning arrangements with the English county of Nottinghamshire.

History

Greater Poland, sometimes called the "cradle of Poland," formed the heart of the 10th-century early Polish state. Poznań and Gniezno were early centers of royal power, but following the region's devastation by pagan rebellion in the 1030s, and an invasion by Bretislaus I of Bohemia in 1038, the capital was moved by Casimir the Restorer from Gniezno to Kraków.

In the testament of Bolesław III Wrymouth, which initiated the period of fragmentation of Poland (1138–1320), the western part of Greater Poland (including Poznań) was granted to Mieszko III the Old. The eastern part, with Gniezno and Kalisz, was part of the Duchy of Kraków, granted to Władysław II the Exile. However, for most of the period the two parts were under a single ruler, and were known as the Duchy of Greater Poland (although at times there were separately ruled duchies of Poznań, Gniezno, Kalisz and Ujście). The region came under the control of Władysław I the Elbow-High in 1314, and thus became part of the reunited Poland of which Władysław was crowned king in 1320.

In the reunited kingdom, and later in the Polish–Lithuanian Commonwealth, the country came to be divided into administrative units called voivodeships. In the case of the Greater Poland region these were Poznań Voivodeship and Kalisz Voivodeship. The Commonwealth also had larger subdivisions known as prowincja, one of which was named Greater Poland. However, this prowincja covered a larger area than the Greater Poland region itself, also taking in Masovia and Royal Prussia. (This division of Crown Poland into two entities called Greater and Lesser Poland had its roots in the Statutes of Casimir the Great of 1346–1362, where the laws of "Greater Poland" – the northern part of the country – were codified in the Piotrków statute, with those of "Lesser Poland" in the separate Wiślica statute.)

In 1768, a new Gniezno Voivodeship was formed out of the northern part of Kalisz Voivodeship. However more far-reaching changes would come with the Partitions of Poland. In the first partition (1772), northern parts of Greater Poland along the Noteć (German Netze) were taken over by Prussia, becoming the Netze District. In the second partition (1793) the whole of Greater Poland was absorbed by Prussia, becoming part of the province of South Prussia. It remained so in spite of the first Greater Poland Uprising (1794), part of the unsuccessful Kościuszko Uprising directed chiefly against the Russian Empire.

More successful was the Greater Poland Uprising of 1806, which led to the region's becoming part of the Napoleonic Duchy of Warsaw (forming the Poznań Department and parts of the Kalisz and Bydgoszcz Departments). However, following the Congress of Vienna in 1815, Greater Poland was again partitioned, with the western part (including Poznań) going to Prussia. The eastern part joined the Russian-controlled Kingdom of Poland, where it formed the Kalisz Voivodeship until 1837, then the Kalisz Governorate (merged into the Warsaw Governorate between 1844 and 1867).

Within the Prussian empire, western Greater Poland became the Grand Duchy of Posen (Poznań), which theoretically held some autonomy. Following an unrealized uprising in 1846, and the more substantial but still unsuccessful uprising of 1848 (during the Spring of Nations), the Grand Duchy was replaced by the Province of Posen. The authorities made efforts to Germanize the region, particularly after the founding of Germany in 1871, and from 1886 onwards the Prussian Settlement Commission was active in increasing German land ownership in formerly Polish areas.

Following the end of World War I, the Greater Poland Uprising (1918–1919) ensured that most of the region became part of the newly independent Polish state, forming most of Poznań Voivodeship (1921–1939). Northern and some western parts of Greater Poland remained in Germany, where they formed much of the province of Posen-West Prussia (1922–1938), whose capital was Schneidemühl (Piła).

Following the German invasion of 1939, Greater Poland was incorporated into Nazi Germany, becoming the province called Reichsgau Posen, later Reichsgau Wartheland (Warthe being the German name for the Warta river). The Polish population was oppressed, with many former officials and others considered potential enemies by the Nazis being imprisoned or executed, including at the notorious Fort VII concentration camp in Poznań. Poznań was declared a stronghold city (Festung) in the closing stages of the war, being taken by the Red Army in the Battle of Poznań, which ended on 22 February 1945.

After the war, Greater Poland was fully within the Polish People's Republic, as Poznań Voivodeship. With the reforms of 1975 this was divided into smaller provinces (the voivodeships of Kalisz, Konin, Leszno and Piła, and a smaller Poznań Voivodeship). The present-day Greater Poland Voivodeship, again with Poznań as its capital, was created in 1999.

Cities and towns 

The voivodeship contains 7 cities and 106 towns. These are listed below in descending order of population (according to official figures for 2019
):
.

Geography

Topography

The relief of Greater Poland, geological conditions and soil have been shaped by two glaciations:
 The Baltic glaciation in the lowlands of northern and central Europe where there are now numerous lakes of the Pomeranian Lake District, a feature especially common in and around Poznań and Gniezno.
 The Mid-glaciation in the southern part of the province, where there is less terrain diversity and a lack of major lakes.

The highest elevation is Greater Kobyla Mountain (284 m) in the Ostrzeszowski Hills, the lowest area is located in the valley of the Warta River at the mouth of its tributary the Noteć (21 m) in the north-western part of the region. Agriculturally fertile soils account for around 60% of the province's area, while 20%, the rest of the non-forested or urban areas, is mostly wetland soil (muck-peat and alluvial soils).

An area of approximately 800 thousand hectares is covered by forests, this represents around 25.8% of the total surface area of the region.
In the lake districts of the northern and central parts of the province there are about 800 lakes; 58% of which cover an area of at least 10 hectares and 8%, with an area exceeding 100 hectares. The largest reservoir is the natural Greater Powidzkie Lake (1036 ha) in the Gniezno Lake District.

Wielkopolska Region lies within the basin of the Oder River, 88% of the province's surface water drains into the Warta river basin, and the remaining 12% is drained by a multitude of other river systems, including the Barycz, Ladislaus Trench and Obrzycy waterways. The quality of river waters is generally poor, but their condition is gradually improving and should soon be classed as 'clean'.

Geology

The main mineral energy resources in Greater Poland are lignite, natural gas, oil and peat.

Brown coal deposits are currently mined in the Konin area, and form the basis for the province's power industry (the Pątnów-Adams-Konin coal-fired power stations account for more than 10% of the national electricity production). The region also has significant quantities of peat deposits; it is calculated that there are ca. 886 thousand hectares of land covered with an average thickness of 1.5 m of peat. An abundance of raw materials used in the production of numerous medicines was recently discovered in the muds of Błażejewo, Oderbank and Mechnacz. In addition, very large deposits of brown coal have been discovered in the vicinity of Kościan, these however are not currently being extracted and probably never will be extracted, due to the expense that would be incurred in adapting the site to build a coal mine and the need to resettle thousands of people.

Rock salt is mined intensively at a salt mine in Kłodawa (this mine alone accounts for about 20% of domestic production).

Throughout the province there are significant deposits of aggregates, gypsum, ceramic materials, and lacustrine chalk. In Kościan the largest and most modern, a natural gas production site is in operation. It supplies raw material for Kościańska Zieme, and Zielona Gora CHP. It is estimated that at the rate local gas reserves are being exploited, the reserves in Kościan will be enough for about 20 years of operation, thus practically allowing for local independence against the effects of gas crises.

Climate
Wielkopolska is influenced by oceanic air masses that affect the mildness of the climate. The farther east one travels the more distinctly continental the climate becomes. The area is situated in the Silesian Greater Poland agro-climatic region where the average annual temperature is about 8.2 °C, and in the north drops to around 7.6 °C. It is slightly warmer in the south and west where the average temperature is usually about 8.5 °C. The number of days with snow can reach up to 57 days in and around the Kalisz district.

The growing season is one of the longest in Poland. On the province's southern plains this season constitutes around 228 days, while north of Gniezno and Szamotuły this gradually declines to 216 days.

Precipitation ranges from 500 to 550 mm. Despite this the region is still faced with a deficit in rainfall, particularly in the eastern part of the province (around Słupcy, Kazimierz Biskupi, Kleczew) where sometimes experience only 450 mm of rainfall per year, this threatens steppization of the region. Throughout the province there is typically a prevailing westerly wind.

Transportation

Greater Poland is a major transport hub within Poland; a great deal of traffic from Russia and other states of the former Soviet Union passes through Poznań and Konin to reach Germany and other EU member states. To the south runs the international route from Gdańsk via Poznań and Leszno to Prague and then to the south of Europe. There is also a major highway in the province, the A2 motorway, which when completed will run from the western border of Poland with Germany, through Poznań to Warsaw and then via Belarus to Moscow.

The main railway hubs located in Greater Poland are Poznań, Piła and Ostrów Wielkopolski. PKP Intercity operate a number of trains a day between Warsaw and Berlin which provide a fast connection for the two cities also to Poznań. This route was the first in Poland, adapted for use by the European high-speed transportation system.
In the near future the government expects to construct a high-speed rail line in the shape of a Y connecting Kalisz and Poznań from Łódź, Warsaw and Wrocław.

Poznań is the port of arrival for most international travellers as it plays host to Ławica International Airport, which has recently seen the second-highest passenger growth rate in the country.

Economy 
The Gross domestic product (GDP) of the province was 40.4 billion € in 2018, accounting for 8.1% of Polish economic output. GDP per capita adjusted for purchasing power was 19,700 € or 65% of the EU27 average in the same year. The GDP per employee was 72% of the EU average.

Politics

The Greater Poland voivodeship's government is headed by the province's voivode (governor) who is appointed by the Polish Prime Minister. The voivode is then assisted in performing his duties by the voivodeship's marshal, who is the appointed speaker for the voivodeship's executive and is elected by the sejmik (provincial assembly). The current voivode of Greater Poland is Łukasz Mikołajczyk, whilst the present marshal is Marek Woźniak.

The Sejmik of Greater Poland consists of 39 members.

2018 local elections

Governors

Administrative division 
Greater Poland Voivodeship is divided into 35 counties (powiats): 4 city counties and 31 land counties. These are further divided into 226 gminas.

The counties are listed in the following table (ordering within categories is by decreasing population).

Protected areas

Protected areas in Greater Poland Voivodeship include two National Parks and 12 Landscape Parks. These are listed below.
Drawno National Park (partly in Lubusz and West Pomeranian Voivodeships)
Greater Poland National Park
Barycz Valley Landscape Park (partly in Lower Silesian Voivodeship)
Chłapowski Landscape Park
Lednica Landscape Park
Powidz Landscape Park
Promno Landscape Park
Przemęt Landscape Park (partly in Lubusz Voivodeship)
Pszczew Landscape Park (partly in Lubusz Voivodeship)
Puszcza Zielonka Landscape Park
Rogalin Landscape Park
Sieraków Landscape Park
Warta Landscape Park
Żerków-Czeszewo Landscape Park

See also

 Prussia's Province of Posen (1818–1919)
 Second Polish Republic's Poznań Voivodeship (1921–1939)

References

Further reading 
 Zygmunt Boras, Książęta Piastowscy Wielkopolski (Piast Princes of Wielkopolska), Poznań, Wydawnictwo Poznańskie, 1983.

External links
wielkopolska-region.pl  Information about Great Poland; Multilingual.
greatpoland.eu   Data base about: Business, Culture, Sport, Motorization, Tourism, Agrotourism, Medicine, Health by CyberWielkopolska
 Greater Poland Local Government Office
 ChefMoz Dining Guide Greater Poland
 

 
1999 establishments in Poland
States and territories established in 1999